Adoy, is a South Korean band formed in 2017. The band debuted on May 17, 2017, with Catnip.

Members
Oh Ju-hwan (오주환)
Zee (지)
Park Geun-chang (박근창)
Jung Da-young (정다영)

Discography

Studio albums

Extended plays

Awards and nominations

References

South Korean co-ed groups
Musical groups established in 2017
2017 establishments in South Korea
Musical quartets